Vega Baja del Segura (in Spanish) or Baix Segura (in Valencian) is a comarca in the province of Alicante, Valencian Community, Spain.

To the north its neighbouring comarcas are the Baix Vinalopó and Vinalopó Mitjà. Its southern limits are also those of the Valencian Community as it meets a different autonomous community, the Region of Murcia.

Municipalities
The comarca is composed of 27 municipalities, listed below with their areas and populations:

References

External links
 Torrevieja city video. From a local resident.

Comarques of the Valencian Community
 Baix Segura
Geography of the Province of Alicante